Vasili Ivanovich Karatayev (born 20 March 1962) is a former Russian professional footballer.

Club career
He made his professional debut in the Soviet Second League in 1981 for FShM Moscow.

Personal life
His identical twin Mikhail Karatayev also played football professionally.

Honours
 Soviet Top League runner-up: 1986.
 Soviet Cup winner: 1984.

European club competitions
With FC Dynamo Moscow.

 European Cup Winners' Cup 1984–85: 8 games, 2 goals.
 UEFA Cup 1987–88: 4 games, 1 goal.

References

1962 births
Living people
Footballers from Moscow
Soviet footballers
Russian footballers
Russian twins
FC Dynamo Moscow players
Rovaniemen Palloseura players
Helsingin Jalkapalloklubi players
Soviet Top League players
Soviet expatriate footballers
Russian expatriate footballers
Expatriate footballers in Finland
Expatriate footballers in Kazakhstan
Veikkausliiga players
Russian expatriate sportspeople in Kazakhstan
Twin sportspeople
Association football midfielders
TP-47 players
FC FShM Torpedo Moscow players
JJK Jyväskylä players